The New Caledonia women's national handball team is the national female handball team of New Caledonia.

Pacific Handball Cup record

French Pacific Handball Cup record

External links
 Profile on International Handball Federation webpage
 Oceania Continent Handball Federation webpage 

Women's national handball teams
Women's handball in France
H